José Ángel Llamas Olmos (born 13 October 1966) is a Mexican retired actor in telenovelas, perhaps best known for his dual role as Pelluco and Rodolfo in Amor descarado.

His striking good looks made him a heartthrob among his many fans. In February 2011, Llamas and his wife, Mara Croatto, became born-again Christians, when he choose to "turn away from the gods of fame, money and power", quit acting, and focus on serving God. His last role was the lead character of José Luis Bermúdez in the telenovela Prófugas del destino. 

Llamas was married to Gaby Cuandón, and they had one son together, Rafael. He married Mara Croatto on August 29, 2004, and they have one son together, Juan Alejandro, and he is step father to her son, Michel Gabriel, from her marriage to Juan "King" Roselló. Llamas is the half-brother of the actress María Eugenia Llamas and author María Victoria Llamas.

Filmography

References

External links
 

1966 births
Living people
Mexican male telenovela actors
Male actors from Mexico City
Mexican expatriates in the United States
Mexican people of Basque descent